India sent a delegation to compete at the 1972 Summer Paralympics in Heidelberg, West Germany. They sent ten competitors, seven male and three female.

Medalist
Murlikant Petkar became the first Indian Paralympic champion when he won a gold medal in swimming.

References 

Nations at the 1972 Summer Paralympics
1972
1972 in Indian sport